The San Xavier Indian Reservation (O’odham: Wa:k) is an Indian reservation of the Tohono O’odham Nation located near Tucson, Arizona, in the Sonoran Desert. It had a 2000 census resident population of 2,053 persons, or 19 percent of the Tohono O’odham population.

Mission 

The reservation is home to a Spanish mission, Mission San Xavier del Bac, which was built in between 1783 and 1797. It is a National Historic Landmark, and has been in continuous use for over 200 years. It was built by Tohono O’odham laborers.

Gaming 

The tribe also operates three casinos, two of which are on the San Xavier section of the reservation. The casino facilities, known as the Desert Diamond and Golden Ha:ṣañ, feature slot machines, table games, video blackjack and other forms of gambling. There is also a buffet. The facility also features a theater for live entertainment.

San Xavier casinos

Desert Diamond Casinos and Entertainment Tucson 
Tohono O'odham Nation
7350 S. Nogales Highway, Tucson
1 mile south of Valencia Rd on Nogales Highway

Desert Diamond Casinos and Entertainment Sahuarita 
1100 W. Pima Mine Rd, Sahuarita
South of Tucson at I-19 and Exit 80 (Pima Mine Rd)

Main Reservation (Papago Reservation) Casino

Desert Diamond Casinos and Entertainment Why 
Highway 86, Why
1 miles east of Why, AZ on Highway 86

This casino is located at the extreme western end of the main reservation (formerly known as the Papago Indian Reservation).

San Lucy District (Glendale, AZ)

West Valley Resort 

Northern Ave and Loop 101 Glendale, AZ.
Future site of the West Valley Resort at Northern Avenue.

See also 

 Tohono O'odham
 Indian reservation
 Black Mountain (Pima County, Arizona)

Notes

References 
 Census Tract 9409 (San Xavier Reservation), Pima County, Arizona; Tohono O'odham Reservation and Off-Reservation Trust Land, Arizona United States Census Bureau

Tohono O'odham Nation reservations
Geography of Pima County, Arizona